The Elymniini is one of the tribes of the subfamily Satyrinae. If the subfamily Satyrinae elevate to family status, this tribe shall be treated as subfamily Elymniinae. Elymniini was formerly a large group, but recently, it is considered to be include only one genus, Elymnias, according to molecular phylogenetic analyses.

Systematics and taxonomy 
The systematics and taxonomy of Satyrinae began to be heavily revised around the 2000s, and this revision continues to this day. Consequently, the subdivisions of this tribe have also undergone significant changes in recent years.

The higher level classification of Satyrine butterfly developed by  became the basis for later taxonomic studies. The work which based on adult morphology, recognised seven subfamilies in the family Satyridae: Haeterinae, Brassolinae, Biinae, Elymniinae, Eritinae, Ragadiinae and Satyrinae, and four tribes within Elymniinae: Lethini, Zetherini, Elymniini and Mycalesini. A later work, largely followed Miller's classification, but downranked the family Satyridae to the subfamily Satyrinae, with the consequent downranking of the subdivisions : subfamilies to tribes, tribes to subtribes, such as Elymniinae to the tribe Elymniini and Elymniini to the subtribe Elymniiti. In these classifications, Elymniinae/Elymniini was the second largest subgroup of Satyrine butterflies after Satyrinae/Satyrini. However, the morphological key characters that defined this group were not entirely definitive and the phylogenetic relationship of this group with other groups in the family/subfamily was confused.

The confusion over the taxonomy and phylogeny of Satyrinae is gradually being resolved by recent developments in molecular phylogenetic studies.  was the first to develop a comprehensive phylogenetic hypothesis of Satyrinae since Miller, and showed that most of the families previously recognised were paraphyletic or polyphyletic.  In the classification proposed in the work, Elymniini included only genus Elymnias, and the genera formerly included in that tribe, such as Lethe, Pararge and Mycalesis, were transferred to several tribes and subtribes, such as Lethina, Parargina and Mycalesina in Satyrini. Subsequent analyses have largely followed this same classification scheme, and also, all of the genera included in Elymniini by Miller were synonymized with Elymnias. Thus, the tribe Elymniini should include only a single genus Elymnias, according to current phylogenetic understanding.

However, this classification is still new and may not always be used in catalogs, picture books, etc. Moreover, phylogenetic analyses have not yet resolved the problems. For example, some analyses relate Hyantis and Morphopsis to this tribe, but others do not, therefore, it is not clear to which tribe these two genera should be placed in. In addition, several different hypotheses have been proposed for the phylogenetic relationship between the tribe Elymniini and other tribes within Satyrinae, thus there is no consensus on the phylogenetic position of this tribe in the subfamily.

Notes

References

Citations

Sources

External links 
 Elymniini at NYMPHALIDAE.net
 Elymniini Herrich-Schaeffer 1864 at TREE OF LIFE web project
 マネシヒカゲ族（Elymniini）のページ at Pteron World (in Japanese)

 
Satyrinae
Butterfly tribes